The 2016 Cork Senior Football Championship was the 128th staging of the Cork Senior Football Championship since its establishment by the Cork County Board in 1887. The draw for the opening round fixtures took place on 13 December 2015. The championship began on 19 April 2016 and ended on 4 December 2016.

Nemo Rangers were the defending champions, however, they were defeated by Ballincollig at the semi-final stage.

On 16 October 2016, Carbery Rangers won the championship following a 1-15 to 1-12 defeat of Ballincollig in the final at Páirc Uí Rinn. It remains their only championship title.

Ballincollig's Cian Dorgan was the championship's top scorer with 2-31.

Team changes

To Championship

Promoted from the Cork Premier Intermediate Football Championship
 Carrigaline

Results

Preliminary round

Round 1

Round 2A

Round 2B

 Clyda Rovers received a bey in this round.

Round 3

 Carbery received a bye in this round.

Relegation Playoffs

Round 4

 Carbery Rangers, St. Finbarr's and Valley Rovers received byes in this round.

Quarter-final

Semi-final

Final

Championship statistics

Top scorers

Top scorers overall

Top scorers in a single game

Miscellaneous

 Carbery Rangers win their first title at the fourth attempt.
 Carbery Rangers and Ballincollig meet in the final for the second time in three seasons.
 Carrigaline make their first appearance at senior level.

References

External link

2016 Cork SFC results

Cork Senior Football Championship
Cork Senior Football Championship